Daniel Nestor and Kevin Ullyett were the defending champions but did not compete that year.

Denis Golovanov and Yevgeny Kafelnikov won in the final 7–5, 6–4 against Irakli Labadze and Marat Safin.

Seeds

  Jiří Novák /  David Rikl (quarterfinals)
  Martin Damm /  David Prinosil (quarterfinals)
  David Adams /  Dominik Hrbatý (semifinals)
  Thomas Shimada /  Myles Wakefield (semifinals)

Draw

External links
 2001 St. Petersburg Open Doubles Draw

St. Petersburg Open
2001 ATP Tour
2001 in Russian tennis